The Exis were a 1950s youth movement in Hamburg, West Germany. The Exis took their name from the existentialist movement, and were influenced by its chief proponents Jean-Paul Sartre and Albert Camus.

Parallels
Quite a few of the Hamburg fans of the Beatles, in the period 1960–1962, regarded themselves as "Exis". In some ways, the Exis were the spiritual successors of the Swing Kids of the 1930s. Both movements were heavily influenced by the prevailing popular culture and music of the United States, whether 1930s jazz, in the case of the Swing Kids or 1950s rock and roll, in the case of the Exis.

Aside from the utterly transformed political and cultural atmosphere in Germany after the war, the biggest difference between the two movements was that, where the Swing Kids wholeheartedly embraced American culture (right down to zoot suits and bobby socks), Exis generally wanted to show that they could think for themselves, as many young people do.

Post-war ties between Britain and Hamburg
One of the factors, which had strengthened the link between British musical acts and the Hamburg clubs, was the presence of large numbers of British servicemen (see British Army of the Rhine), in the north-west of Germany. In the aftermath of the Second World War, it became common practice for music promoters in north Western Germany, a number of whom were British themselves, to book British acts. However, some parts of Hamburg were off limits to soldiers and airmen and they never seem to have had the influence, which one might have expected, in the post-war development of St. Pauli. This was partly because of the changing political and legal position. After 1955, they were "guests" on the territory of an ally and NATO member. Before the establishment of the Federal Republic of Germany (i.e. West Germany) in 1949, the British forces had actually governed their sector.

St Pauli, a haven for those who are different
In any case, the St. Pauli district was a place for sailors to relax and artisans to experiment with new ideas, long before the Reeperbahn became internationally famous. In addition, "Hamburgers" have always had some sense of being different from other Germans and the area around the Grosse Freiheit, originally just outside the city boundary, was where people were allowed to "do their own thing", in various ways (but primarily when it came to religion), as far back as the eighteenth century.

Influences on fashions and image
While the fashion choices of some Exis had a slightly preppy or conservative quality (and, given the middle-class background of most of them, this was probably unavoidable), many sought to distance themselves from the blue-jeaned, check-shirted excesses of President Dwight D. Eisenhower's America, by projecting a somewhat darker and more introspective image. Sartre's black polo-neck sweaters and Gauloises cigarettes were the most obvious symbols. In an interview with NPR, Astrid Kirchherr described the Exi style in Hamburg as consisting of black clothes and very long scarves trailing to the floor.

However some American icons of the time, such as James Dean and Marlon Brando, were, in the eyes of most middle-aged Americans of the 1950s, young rebels, rather than suitable role models for the nation's youth. Thus, they were bound to be more attractive to those adolescents, who were trying to stand out from the rest of society, than the "respectable" performers, whom parents admired.

The dress of British and American rockers and bikers, the vast majority of whom had not been anywhere near Hamburg, was not vastly different from some of the Exis but to obsessive teenagers, an extra zip, here and there, can be everything and such comparisons may well have been dismissed by Exis (or Rockers), at the time. There are also similarities to jazz musicians and some of their fans but the Exis did not listen exclusively to rock and roll, that unruly mix of country and western and rhythm and blues.

References

Culture in Hamburg
Existentialists
Fashion
History of the Beatles
German youth culture